Acridoschema is a genus of longhorn beetles of the subfamily Lamiinae.

 Acridoschema aberrans (Jordan, 1894)
 Acridoschema capricorne Thomson, 1858
 Acridoschema flavolineatum Breuning, 1970
 Acridoschema isidori Chevrolat, 1858
 Acridoschema itzingeri Breuning, 1935
 Acridoschema ligatum Quedenfeldt, 1882
 Acridoschema thomense Jordan, 1903
 Acridoschema tuberculicolle (Breuning, 1950)

References

Acmocerini
Cerambycidae genera